Arthur Olsen may refer to:

Ole Olsen (baseball) (Arthur Ole Olsen, 1894–1980), American baseball pitcher
Arthur Olsen (boxer, born 1900) (1900–1951), Norwegian boxer who competed at the 1920 Olympics
Arthur Olsen (boxer, born 1907) (1907–1943), Norwegian boxer who competed at the 1928 Olympics
Arthur Olsen (politician) (1914–2014), American politician

See also
 Arthur David Olson, founding contributor of the tz database
Arthur Olsson (1926–2013), Swedish cross-country skier